Ali Saip Ursavaş, also known as Ali Saib Bey (1885, in Rowanduz – September 25, 1939 in Adana) was an Iraqi-Turkish officer of Kurdish origin, having served in the Ottoman and Turkish armies, and one of the early key members of CHP. He was also a prominent politician of the Republic of Turkey. In 1925 he was nominated prosecutor at the Independence Tribunal in Diyarbakır which was established to counter the Sheikh Said Rebellion and sentenced Sheikh Said to death. Later he succeeded  as the Tribunals president.

Works
Kilikya Faciaları ve Urfa Kurtuluş Mücadeleleri, Ankara, 1940.

Medals and decorations
Medal of Independence with Red-Green Ribbon

See also
List of recipients of the Medal of Independence with Red-Green Ribbon (Turkey)
Battle of Urfa

Sources

1885 births
1939 deaths
People from Rawandiz
Turkish people of Kurdish descent
Republican People's Party (Turkey) politicians
Deputies of Şanlıurfa
Ottoman Army officers
Turkish militia officers
Ottoman military personnel of the Italo-Turkish War
Ottoman military personnel of World War I
Turkish military personnel of the Franco-Turkish War
Members of Kuva-yi Milliye
Sheikh Said rebellion
Ottoman Military Academy alumni
Recipients of the Medal of Independence with Red-Green Ribbon (Turkey)